Arnaud d'Usseau (April 18, 1916 – January 29, 1990) was a playwright and B-movie screenwriter who is perhaps best remembered today for his collaboration with Dorothy Parker on the play The Ladies of the Corridor.

Career

D'Usseau was born in Los Angeles and was the son of Leon d'Usseau, also a screenwriter and director of some repute during the silent era. His mother, Ottola “Tola” Smith D’Usseau, was a character actress. He first came to notice as the co-writer (with James Gow) of Tomorrow, the World!, a 1943 drama about a German boy adopted by an American couple who then have to struggle with his Nazi upbringing. In 1945, another controversial play by D'Usseau and Gow followed, Deep Are the Roots, about a black army officer who falls in love with a former Senator's daughter. It ran for 477 performances over 14 months, directed by Elia Kazan and starring Barbara Bel Geddes and Gordon Heath. In 2012 the play was produced at the Metropolitan Playhouse.

In late 1950, his name appeared on the Hollywood blacklist as a Communist sympathizer. He was forced to appear before Senator Joseph McCarthy's anti-communist Tydings Committee in 1953, but declined to answer any questions, declaring that he would be glad to discuss Communism with the Senator in a forum where the cards were not stacked against him. Afterwards, he moved to Europe and continued to write screenplays under various pseudonyms. Upon returning to the United States, he taught screenwriting at New York University and the School of Visual Arts.

He died in 1990 at his home in New York, following surgery for stomach cancer.

Selected filmography

 One Crowded Night (1940) dir. Irving Reis: Billie Seward, Gale Storm
 Lady Scarface (1941) dir. Frank Woodruff: Dennis O'Keefe, Frances Neal
 Repent at Leisure (1941) dir. Frank Woodruff: Kent Taylor, Wendy Barrie
 The Man Who Wouldn't Die (1942) dir. Herbert Leeds: Lloyd Nolan, Marjorie Weaver
 Who Is Hope Schuyler? (1942) dir. Thomas Loring: Joseph Allen, Jr., Mary Howard
 Just Off Broadway (1942) dir. Herbert Leeds: Lloyd Nolan, Marjorie Weaver
 Horror Express (1972) dir. Eugenio Martin: Peter Cushing, Christopher Lee, Telly Savalas
 Psychomania (1973) dir. Don Sharp: Nicky Henson, George Sanders, Beryl Reid

References

Sources
Film Reference

American male screenwriters
Writers from Los Angeles
1916 births
1990 deaths
American people of French descent
New York University faculty
20th-century American dramatists and playwrights
American male dramatists and playwrights
20th-century American male writers
Screenwriters from New York (state)
Screenwriters from California
20th-century American screenwriters